Yan Qing is a fictional character in Water Margin, one of the Four Great Classical Novels in Chinese literature. Nicknamed "Langzi" (浪子; meaning "the Wanderer" or "the Prodigal"), he ranks last among the 36 Heavenly Spirits, the first third of the 108 Stars of Destiny.

Background
Yan Qing, who is more than six chi tall, is a handsome youth with a fair complexion, red lips, thick eyebrows, broad shoulders and a narrow waist. Tattoos of big bright flowers cover his body. In addition to his skill in martial arts, archery and wrestling, Yan Qing sings well and plays many kinds of instruments. His charming looks, his proficiency in learning new tongues and his astuteness in assessing situations and picking up leads make him an ideal spy and infiltrator. He realises this potential after joining Liangshan.

Orphaned when a child, Yan Qing is raised by the wealthy squire Lu Junyi, who lives in Daming Prefecture. Grateful to Lu, Yan Qing, who becomes one of two stewards in Lu's house, is steadfastly loyal to his master.

Becoming an outlaw
Lu Junyi is conned by Wu Yong, the chief strategist of Liangshan Marsh, to travel to the vicinity of the stronghold, which is eager to recruit him for his consummate fighting skill. Lu is lured into the marsh where he is captured in the water. The outlaws treat him with respect despite his refusal to join them and retain him for months. However, they release Li Gu first, the steward who has come along with Lu, lying to the man that they have convinced his master to join them. Yan Qing is not involved in the trip.

Finally released, Lu rushes back to Daming. Coming near home, he runs into Yan Qing, who has been reduced to begging on the streets as he waits for his master to return. Yan tells Lu not to go home as he is now wanted for his association with Liangshan. One proof of this is a poem written earlier on a wall in his home by Wu Yong, which suggests he has rebelled against the government. Lu has been led to believe the poem is for dispelling bad luck. Li Gu, who is having an affair with Lu's wife, is told of the poem‘s incriminating message by Liangshan. When Li reached home from Liangshan, he expelled Yan Qing and took over Lu's property and wife. 

Not believing Yan Qing, Lu heads home and is arrested by soldiers called by Li Gu. He is exiled to  Shamen Island (沙門島; present-day Changdao County, Shandong). Li Gu bribes the two guards escorting him to finish him off along the way. Yan Qing, who is often armed with a slingshot-like bow and three short arrows, tails them and shoots the guards to death when they are about to murder Lu in a wood. Master and servant decide to go to Liangshan. But Lu, who is weak from days of torture, is captured again by soldiers at an inn when Yan Qing goes to look for food. Rushing to Liangshan to seek help, Yan runs into Shi Xiu and Yang Xiong, who are going to Daming to check on Lu. Shi Xiu proceeds on to Daming while Yang Xiong takes Yan Qing back to Liangshan. Although Shi manages to save Lu  just as he is about to be beheaded, the two are captured. The Liangshan outlaws rescue them after some hard fights with government forces.

Life at Liangshan
Yan Qing is appointed as one of the leaders of the Liangshan infantry after the 108 Stars of Destiny came together in what is called the Grand Assembly. 

Yan Qing forms close friendship with Li Kui. On one occasion, he travels to Tai'anzhou (泰安州; present-day Tai'an, Shandong), accompanied by Li, to challenge one Ren Yuan, who claims to be invincible in wrestling in the Song Empire. Indeed Ren has been winning contests in Tai'anzhou. Although much smaller in size, Yan Qing beats the burly guy on stage with his skill and agility. When Ren's students rush to snatch the prizes, they break into a fight with Li Kui, who is immediately recognised by some spectators as an outlaw from Liangshan. A stampede ensues while soldiers arrive to arrest Li. Yan and Li fight their way out and return to Liangshan safely.

Role in securing amnesty for Liangshan
Song Jiang, the leader of the outlaws, wants to obtain an imperial amnesty for Liangshan so that they could serve the Song Empire. Upon learning that Emperor Huizong is secretly seeing the courtesan Li Shishi, he sends Yan Qing to contact her in the imperial capital Dongjing and ask her to set up a meeting between him and the monarch. Li Shishi, however, is infatuated with the dashing and handsome Yan and tries to seduce him. But he pretends to be oblivious to her hints and instead makes her agree to be his sworn sister.

One night, when the emperor visits Li Shishi, he is surprised to find Yan Qing in her chamber. Li introduces him as her cousin. After entertaining the emperor with some ballads, Yan tells the monarch he knows the Liangshan outlaws and relays their wish for an amnesty. At Li Shishi's insistence, the emperor writes an edict that grants Yan immunity from the law. He also promises to consider pardoning Liangshan. After that, Yan Qing and Dai Zong visit Grand Marshal Su Yuanjing, who agrees to put in a good word for Liangshan.

Campaigns
Following the amnesty for Liangshan, Yan Qing participates in the campaigns against the Liao invaders and rebel forces in Song territory, which the outlaws are ordered to undertake to atone for their crimes.  

Yan Qing makes many contributions, chief of which is the sabotage on the rebel force of Fang La after infiltrating it with Chai Jin, who insinuated himself into Fang's confidence disguised as a businessman.  As the surviving heroes return to Dongjing for rewards, Yan Qing senses that hostile forces in the court would cause them harm. He slips away one night amid the return trip, leaving a poem for Song Jiang saying that he does not covet glory. Legend has it that he finds Li Shishi and they live together in anonymity for the rest of their lives.

References
 
 
 
 
 
 
 

36 Heavenly Spirits
Chinese male archers
Fictional archers
Fictional wrestlers
Fictional characters from Hebei